A Le Mans Prototype (LMP) is the type of sports prototype race car used in the 24 Hours of Le Mans, FIA World Endurance Championship, IMSA SportsCar Championship, European Le Mans Series and Asian Le Mans Series. Le Mans Prototypes were created by the Automobile Club de l'Ouest (ACO). The technical requirements for an LMP include bodywork covering all mechanical elements of the car. Currently, there are three classes within Le Mans Prototypes, designated LMP1, LMP2, and LMP3.

While not as fast as open-wheel Formula One cars around a track, LMP1s were the fastest closed-wheel racing cars used in circuit racing. Le Mans Prototypes are considered a class above production-based grand tourer cars, which compete alongside them in sports car racing. Later LMP1 designs included hybrid cars that use electric motors to assist acceleration.

The Le Mans Prototype LMP1 class has been replaced by Le Mans Hypercars in the FIA World Endurance Championship, and the 24 Hours of Le Mans from the 2021 season. Non-hybrid LMP1 cars were eligible to be "grandfathered" for two more seasons and compete alongside the new class for the 2021 to 2022 seasons.

Starting from the 2023 season of FIA World Endurance Championship and IMSA SportsCar Championship, Le Mans Hypercars will be joined by Le Mans Daytona h (LMDh) cars. These two kinds of prototypes will form the top class of endurance racing: .

Name variations 
Le Mans Prototypes have used various names depending on the series in which they compete. The FIA's equivalent cars were referred to as Sports Racers (SR) or Sports Racing Prototypes (SRP). The American IMSA GT Championship termed their cars World Sports Cars (WSC), while the short-lived United States Road Racing Championship (USRRC) used the classic Can-Am (CA) name for their prototypes. Since 2004, most series have switched to referring to these cars as Le Mans Prototypes. The American Le Mans Series, the successor to the IMSA GT Championship and the predecessor of the TUDOR United SportsCar Championship, officially referred to the cars simply as Prototypes (P1, P2, or PC). An LMP is commonly referred to as a Le Mans car in the media.

History

The first use of what would become Le Mans Prototypes was at the 1992 24 Hours of Le Mans. In an attempt to increase the number of entrants beyond the small field of Group C competitors that the World Sportscar Championship had to offer, older Porsche 962s were allowed entry in Category 3. To further increase the size of the field, small open-cockpit race cars using production road car engines which were raced in small national championships were allowed in Category 4.

Later, ACO announced its intentions to completely replace the Group C cars with Le Mans Prototypes. Two classes were created, with LMP1s running large displacement custom-built engines that were usually turbocharged, and LMP2s using the smaller displacement production-based engines. Both classes were required to have open cockpits. However, LMP1 cars that year were just former Group C cars, some still with closed cockpits (Toyota 94C-V, Courage C32, Kremer K8 Spyder, Porsche 962C GTI, ALD C289 and Alpa LM). At the same time, the IMSA GT Championship announced the end of their closed cockpit GTP and Lights classes, deciding as well to replace them with a single open-cockpit class of World Sports Cars equivalent to LMP1.

This formula continued up to 1996, with many manufacturers embracing the LMP and WSC classes, including Ferrari, Porsche, and Mazda. In 1997, the first European series based around Le Mans Prototypes was launched, known as the "International Sports Racing Series". Using classes similar to LMP1/WSC and LMP2, these cars were known as "SR1" and "SR2" by the FIA. 1998 saw the creation of another series of Le Mans Prototypes, with the new United States Road Racing Championship attempting to break away from the IMSA GT Championship. To differ from IMSA'S WSC class, the USRRC named their open-cockpit prototypes "Can-Am" in an attempt to resurrect the sportscar championship of the 1970s. However, the USRRC collapsed before the end of 1999, with the series becoming the Rolex Sports Car Series chose to use the FIA's SR1 and SR2 formula instead.

1998 saw a great expansion for the ACO's LMP classes. Following the cancellation of the IMSA GT Championship at the end of 1998, the ACO allowed for the creation of the American Le Mans Series. This series used the same class structure as the 24 Hours of Le Mans, meaning it was the first championship to use the LMP name. At the same time, the ACO greatly altered their LMP classes. The smaller LMP2 class were briefly eliminated, while a new class of closed-cockpit prototypes was allowed in, known as "LMGTP" (Le Mans grand touring prototype). These cars were evolutions of production-based road cars that the ACO considered too advanced and too fast to fall under the GT class regulations, forcing the ACO to promote them as prototypes.

In 2000, changes were made to the LMP regulations, as the ACO once again split the open-cockpit LMP class. The two new classes became known as "LMP900" and "LMP675", with the numbers denoting the minimum weight requirements (in kilograms) for each class. The LMP900s were to be more powerful and faster in top speed, but also heavier and more cumbersome. The LMP675s were to be smaller and more nimble, yet lack the top speed of the larger class. Both classes were intended to be able to compete for overall wins. Audi, Chrysler, Cadillac, and Panoz opted to use the LMP900 formula, while MG were the only major manufacturer to attempt the LMP675 class. The LMGTP class also continued, with Bentley being the only manufacturer to build a closed-cockpit prototype after the regulation changes in 2000.

In 2017, in order to limit the costs, FIA introduced a new set of LMP2 regulations, which will be locked in through 2020, aiming for a significant power increase, to the range of 150 horsepower (which is expected to lead to a four-second decrease in lap time at Le Mans). Gibson Technology is the exclusive engine supplier for LMP2, producing a four-litre normally-aspirated V8.

Technical regulations
Biofuels, specifically petrol with 10% ethanol and biodiesel (BTL), are allowed in both LMP1 and LMP2 categories.

LMP1

The fuel tank size and minimum weight for non-hybrid cars was  subject to adjustment to reduce the difference in performance between hybrid and non-hybrid cars.

There were no limits on the number of cylinders for any type of engine.

Bodywork was required to cover all mechanical elements of the car, so that they couldn't be visible when the car is viewed directly from the front, side, or top.

The LMP1 cars were generally the most powerful, with higher straight-line speeds.

The LMP1 category was retired at the end of the 2020 season, replaced by a new top class of the endurance racing: Hypercar.

LMP2

From 2017, in order to limit the costs, FIA introduced a new set of regulations, which will be locked in through 2025, aiming a significant power increase, to the range of 150 horsepower (which is expected to lead to a four-second decrease in lap time at Le Mans). Gibson Technology is the exclusive engine supplier, producing a 4.2-litre naturally-aspirated V8. In seasons 2017 through 2020, the engine produced about 600 bhp.

Dallara, Onroak Automotive (Ligier), Oreca and the joint-venture Riley Tech/Multimatic were selected by FIA as the four exclusive chassis constructors, which must be closed-cockpit designs.

Before the start of the 2021 season LMP2 cars have been slowed down to ensure the necessary lap time difference between the LMP2 and a new class—Hypercar. In the original version of the new ruleset, revealed in November 2020, only the power of the Gibson engine has been reduced—to 560 bhp. Right before the start of the season, the cars were further weakened, by trimming an additional 20 bhp to a total of 540 bhp. The minimum weight of the cars has also been increased by 20 kg and has been set at 950 kg. Furthermore, mirroring the Hypercar category, a single aero kit has been made mandatory across the whole season and is limited to the Le Mans specification in the WEC; the ELMS teams have retained the right to switch between the aero kits.

LMP3

LMP3 is an entry-level prototype class intended for introducing young drivers and new teams to endurance racing before they progress to the higher classes of prototype racing, LMP2 and ultimately Hypercar. LMP3 uses closed-cockpit chassis, which can be built by any licensed constructor, powered by a 5.6-litre normally-aspirated Nissan V8 engine, producing 455 bhp.

The cars eligible for use in the class were: Ginetta-Juno P3, Ligier JS P3, Norma M30, ADESS-03, and the Ave-Riley AR-02. The cars were eligible in a number of series, such as the Asian Le Mans Series, the European Le Mans Series, as well as the V de V Endurance Series and the IMSA Prototype Challenge. A number of championships for the class have also been created, such as the FRD LMP3 series and the British LMP3 Cup.

A 2nd Generation ruleset was introduced for 2020, with new cars introduced, namely the Ginetta G61-LT-P3, Ligier JS P320, Duqueine D-08, and the ADESS-03 Evo. These cars can be built from its predecessors using an upgrade kit. The new LMP3 prototypes are used in Asian Le Mans Series, Michelin Le Mans Cup, European Le Mans Series, IMSA Prototype Challenge, IMSA SportsCar Championship and Prototype Cup Germany.

LMPC

LMPC (Le Mans Prototype Challenge) was an earlier entry level class, introduced in 2009, consisting of competitors running identical Oreca FLM09 cars. The class was dropped in European Le Mans Series in 2014. As the cost of running an LMPC team was found to be comparable to that for an LMP2 team, the class was dropped after the 2017 season in the WeatherTech SportsCar Championship.

See also

 List of Le Mans Prototypes
 Daytona Prototype
 Daytona Prototype International (DPi)
 Formula Le Mans
 Group 6
 Japan Le Mans Challenge

References

External links
 

 
24 Hours of Le Mans
Racing car classes
Sports car racing